Lying Lips is a 1921 American silent drama film directed by John Griffith Wray and starring House Peters, Florence Vidor, and Joseph Kilgour. Produced by the independent producer Thomas H. Ince for the short-lived Associated Producers company, the film was a financial success, grossing $446,000 against a budget of $263,000. It is based on a story by the British writer May Edginton.

Synopsis
An English aristocrat is engaged to be married, but before her wedding she visits Canada where she falls in love with a rancher. On her return to London she faces the difficult of reconciling her love against fears of hardship.

Cast
 House Peters as Blair Cornwall 
 Florence Vidor as Nancy Abbott 
 Joseph Kilgour as William Chase 
 Margaret Livingston as Lelia Dodson 
 Margaret Campbell as Mrs. Abbott 
 Edith Murgatroyd as Mrs. Prospect 
 Calvert Carter as Horace Prospect 
 Emmett King as John Warren

Preservation
A fragment of Lying Lips is held in the Ince collection.

References

Bibliography
 Taves, Brian. Thomas Ince: Hollywood's Independent Pioneer. University Press of Kentucky, 2012.

External links

 

1921 films
1921 drama films
1920s English-language films
American silent feature films
Silent American drama films
American black-and-white films
Films directed by John Griffith Wray
Films set in London
Films set in Canada
1920s American films